The  is a diesel multiple unit (DMU) train type operated by the Central Japan Railway Company (JR Central) on local and rapid services in Japan, since March 2011. Following electrification of the Taketoyo Line in 2015, they replaced KiHa 40 series DMUs on the Takayama and Taita Lines.

Variants
 KiHa 25: 1st-batch 2-car sets in service since March 2011
 KiHa 25-1000: 2nd-batch cold-region 2-car sets in service since 1 December 2014
 KiHa 25-1500: Warm-region 2-car sets

Operations
 Taketoyo Line (2011 - 2015)
 Takayama Main Line (since March 2015)
 Taita Line
 Kisei Main Line (since 1 August 2015)
 Sangū Line (since 1 August 2015)

During special events like the Formula One Grand Prix held at Suzuka Circuit every October, the KiHa 25 units will also serve the Ise Line and Kansai Main Line.

Formations
, the fleet consists of 26 cars, formed as five two-car first-batch sets (P1 to P5), and eight two-car second-batch sets (P101 to P108).

KiHa 25-0 series
The 1st-batch sets are formed as follows.

The KiHa 25-0 cars have a universal access toilet.

KiHa 25-1000 series
The KiHa 25-1000 series sets are formed as follows.

The KiHa 25-1000 cars have a universal access toilet.

Exterior
The car bodies are constructed of stainless steel and are based on JR Central's 313 series electric multiple unit design. The beading on the lower bodyside was discontinued on the second-batch units, giving flush body sides. The second-batch units have cushions on the front-end skirts to prevent damage from collisions with deer.

Interior
Seating in the first-batch units (P1 to P5) consists of transverse flip-over seats arranged 2+2 abreast, with interiors based on the 313-1300 series EMU design. The second-batch sets (P101 onward) have longitudinal seating.

History
The first two sets, P1 and P2, were delivered from the Nippon Sharyo factory in Toyokawa to Nagoya on 10 November 2010. The remaining three sets, P3 to P5, were delivered on 23 February 2011.

The type entered service on the Taketoyo Line from 1 March 2011.

A second batch of KiHa 25 series trains is on order by JR Central, with a total of 52 new vehicles scheduled to be introduced between fiscal 2014 and 2015 on the Takayama Main Line, Taita Line, Kisei Main Line, and Sangu Line, at a cost of approximately 12 billion yen, replacing all remaining former JNR-era DMUs, including KiHa 40, KiHa 47, and KiHa 48 types. The new batch of trains will include LED interior lighting.

The first three new second-batch sets were delivered from the Nippon Sharyo factory in Toyokawa in September 2014.

See also
 313 series, EMU counterpart

References

Further reading

External links

 JR Central KiHa 25 information 

25
Central Japan Railway Company
Train-related introductions in 2011
Nippon Sharyo multiple units